Meeting with the G-Man is a posthumous live album released by Irish blues guitarist Rory Gallagher in 2003. It is a live collection recorded at the Paradiso in Amsterdam on December 20, 1993. Meeting with the G-Man is an expanded version of this 'bootleg' gig that was previously only available in the 2001 box-set Let's Go to Work & features 14 tracks.

Track listing
All tracks composed by Rory Gallagher; except where indicated
 "Continental Op" [from Defender] – 6:54
 "Moonchild" [from Calling Card] - 5:57
 "Mean Disposition" - 9:03
 "The Loop" [from Fresh Evidence] - 5:46
 "Don't Start Me Talkin'" [from Defender] - 7:07
 "She Moved Thro' The Fair" (Traditional) - 1:07
 "Out On The Western Plain" (Huddie Ledbetter) [from Against the Grain] - 3:58
 "William of Green" (Traditional) - 1:36
 "Mercy River/Amazing Grace" (John Newton) - 2:19
 "Walkin' Blues" (Robert Johnson) - 5:02
 "Don't Think Twice, It's Alright"  (Bob Dylan) - 2:36
 "Ghost Blues" [from Fresh Evidence] - 7:15
 "Messin' with the Kid" (Mel London, Junior Wells) - 6:52
 "La Bamba" (Traditional; arranged by Ritchie Valens) - 5:12

Personnel 
Rory Gallagher – vocals, guitar
David Levy – bass guitar
Jim Leverton - keyboards
Richard Newman – drums
Mark Feltham - harmonica

References

External links 
 Album's page at Rory Gallagher official site

2003 live albums
Rory Gallagher albums
RCA Records live albums
Albums produced by Rory Gallagher